Au Pair is a made-for-television film series directed by Mark Griffiths and released by Saban Entertainment in association with ABC Family.

Cast and crew

References

External links
 
 
 

Film series introduced in 1999
Disney Media Networks franchises
ABC Family original films
American film series
Comedy film series
Au pairs in films
Television film series
Trilogies